John Coburn (October 27, 1825 – January 28, 1908) was a United States Representative from Indiana and an officer in the Union Army during the American Civil War.

Early life and career
Coburn was born in Indianapolis, Indiana, in 1825 (the year the city became the new state capital) and attended the public schools there. Later, he attended Wabash College in Crawfordsville, Indiana, graduating in 1846. As a student, he founded the Wabash College chapter of Beta Theta Pi fraternity, the first Greek letter fraternity on the campus and in continuous existence to today. He studied law, was admitted to the bar in 1849, and commenced practice in Indianapolis.

Civil War 
Coburn was a member of the Indiana House of Representatives in 1850. He served as a judge of the Court of Common Pleas from 1859 to 1861, when he resigned to enter the Union Army following the outbreak of the American Civil War. He became colonel of the 33rd Indiana Infantry on September 16, 1861.

He was captured in Kentucky and spent time in Libby Prison before being exchanged. Later, Coburn and Colonel Benjamin Harrison fought side by side in several battles while under General William Tecumseh Sherman's command. During that time, Coburn and his troops were the first into Atlanta and secured the city's surrender. There is a large marker in downtown Atlanta where the city's mayor surrendered the city to Coburn. He was mustered out on September 20, 1864.

On January 13, 1866, President Andrew Johnson nominated Coburn for appointment to the grade of brevet brigadier general of volunteers, to rank from March 13, 1865, and the United States Senate confirmed the appointment on March 12, 1866.

Coburn and his father were instrumental in saving the Indiana Historical Society and its papers in its early days. Coburn also gave one of the dedication speeches for the Indianapolis Soldiers and Sailors Monument.

He promoted the building of the Soldiers' and Sailors' Orphanage in Knightstown, Indiana, and he helped secure the use of land in Indianapolis for Garfield Park. His later years were spent living in the Bates-Hendricks House at 1526 S. New Jersey Street in Indianapolis with his wife Caroline (Test) Coburn until his death in 1908.

Congressional service
Coburn was appointed as the first secretary of the Territory of Montana in March 1865 but resigned at once. He was elected judge of the fifth judicial circuit of Indiana in October 1865 and resigned in July 1866. Later, he was elected as a Republican to the Fortieth and to the three succeeding Congresses (March 4, 1867 – March 3, 1875). While in Congress, he served as chairman of the Committee on Public Expenditures (41st Congress), and as a member of Committee on Military Affairs (42nd and 43rd Congresses). He was an unsuccessful candidate for reelection in 1874 to the 44th Congress.

After leaving Congress, he was appointed a justice of the Supreme Court of the Territory of Montana on February 19, 1884, and served until December 1885. He returned to Indianapolis, and resumed the practice of law. He died in Indianapolis on January 28, 1908, and was buried in Crown Hill Cemetery.

See also

List of American Civil War brevet generals (Union)
Atlanta in the American Civil War

References
 Retrieved on 2008-02-12
Coburn, John. An address delivered by General John Coburn, on Memorial Day, May 30, 1905. Indianapolis: Jacobs Stationery and Printing Company, 1905.
Coburn, John. Life and services of John B. Dillon. Indianapolis: The Bowen-Merrill Co., 1886.
Eicher, John H., and David J. Eicher, Civil War High Commands. Stanford: Stanford University Press, 2001. 
Welcher, Frank Johnson, and Larry G. Ligget. Coburn’s Brigade: The 85th Indiana, 33rd Indiana, 19th Michigan, and 22nd Wisconsin in the Western Civil War. Carmel, Ind.: Guild Press of Indiana, 1999.

Specific

External links
 John L. Coburn collection, Rare Books and Manuscripts, Indiana State Library

1825 births
1908 deaths
Republican Party members of the Indiana House of Representatives
Indiana state court judges
Montana Territory judges
Politicians from Indianapolis
People of Indiana in the American Civil War
Union Army generals
Burials at Crown Hill Cemetery
Wabash College alumni
American Civil War prisoners of war
19th-century American politicians
19th-century American judges
Republican Party members of the United States House of Representatives from Indiana